Boston Mutual Lyceum was an African American lyceum organization founded in 1833. It included women and had a female vice-president. Two of five managers were also women. The Adelphic Union was an African American literary society in Boston at the same time.

Officers were: Dudley Tidd, president; Joel W. Lewis, 1st vice-president; Sarah H. Annible, 2nd vice-president; Nath Cutler, secretary; and Thomas Dalton, treasurer. Managers were Joseph H. Gover, John B. Cutler, Henry Carroll, Lucy V. Lew, and Mary Williams. Josiah Holbrook helped organize the group.

Tidd was a laborer who became a property owner along with Dalton, who had been a bootblack.

The abolitionist newspaper The Liberator  published by William Lloyd Garrison published a brief notice of the formation of the group listing its officers and managers.

A Lew family history is known and she may have become Thomas Dalton's wife, known as Lucy Lew Dalton. Lucy Lew Dalton is part of the Boston Women's Heritage Trail.

See also
Abiel Smith School
Massasoit Guards

References

1833 establishments in Massachusetts
Lyceums
Clubs and societies in Boston
African-American history in Boston